Jeremy Henley Burroughes  (born August 1960) is a British physicist and engineer, known for his contributions to the development of organic electronics through his work on the science of semiconducting polymers and molecules and their application. He is the Chief Technology Officer of Cambridge Display Technology, a company specialising in the development of technologies based on polymer light-emitting diodes.

Education
Burroughes earned his PhD from the University of Cambridge in 1989. His thesis was entitled The physical processes in organic semiconducting polymer devices.

Work 
Early in his career, Burroughes discovered that certain conjugated polymers were capable of emitting light when an electric current passed through them. The discovery of this previously unknown form of electroluminescence led to the foundation of Cambridge Display Technology where Burroughes has been responsible for a number of technology innovations, including the direct printing of full-colour OLED displays.

Awards and honours 
Burroughes was elected a Fellow of the Royal Society (FRS) in 2012. His certificate of election reads:

References 

1960 births
Living people
British physicists
Electronic engineering
Alumni of the University of Cambridge
Fellows of the Royal Society